Live on the Sunset Strip is a live EP by American heavy metal band Fear Factory, released in 2005 by Calvin Records. It contains 3 tracks recorded in the summer of 2004 at the House of Blues, Los Angeles, CA.

Track listing

2005 EPs
Live EPs
Fear Factory EPs
2005 live albums